Posyolok Oktyabrskogo otdeleniya sovkhoza Pugachyovsky is a rural locality (a settlement) in Pugachyovskoye Rural Settlement, Anninsky District, Voronezh Oblast, Russia. The population was 74 as of 2010. There are 4 streets.

Geography 
The settlement is located 30 km northeast of Anna (the district's administrative centre) by road. Posyolok Pervomayskogo otdeleniya sovkhoza Pugachyovsky is the nearest rural locality.

References 

Rural localities in Anninsky District